P. B. Abdul Razak (1 October 1955 – 20 October 2018) was a Member of the Kerala Legislative Assembly from Manjeshwar constituency from 2011-2018. 

Razak was a businessman and was first elected in 2011 defeating K Surendran of the Bharatiya Janata Party  by 5,828 votes. He was re-elected in 2016 defeating K Surendran of the Bharatiya Janata Party again by 89 votes. He died in 2018 of a heart attack.

References

1955 births
2018 deaths
Indian Union Muslim League politicians
Kerala MLAs 2016–2021
People from Kasaragod district